Longparish is a village and civil parish in Hampshire, England. It is composed of the four hamlets of Middleton, East Aston, West Aston and Forton that over time have expanded and effectively joined up to become one village. Longparish is situated on the northwest bank of the River Test. In 2011 the population (including Firgo and Forton) was 716.

Etymology
The name Longparish was first used in the mid-16th-century and is derived from a nickname for the "long parish" of Middleton — consisting of the settlements of Middleton, East Aston, West Aston and Forton — which stretched some four miles along the River Test. The parish of Middleton was first recorded as "Middletune" in the Domesday Survey of 1086.

Landmarks
A 19th-century monument, Dead Man's Plack, stands nearby.

Notable people
Colonel Peter Hawker, 19th-century diarist, author and sportsman who lived at Longparish House.
Major Lanoe Hawker VC, Royal Flying Corps ace was born here; A window (designed by Francis Skeat) commemorating Hawker was installed in St Nicholas church  in 1967.
Lt Col. Alfred Tippinge of the British Grenadiers, recipient of the Legion of Honour, lived at Longparish House.
John Charles Woodcock OBE, cricket writer, born and lived here all his life

References

Further reading
 Rev. Martin Coppen (editor) St Nicholas, Longparish: A Church Guide 2009 (available from the church)

External links

 Longparish, Hampshire (Longparish Parish Council)
 Longparish Community Association
 Stained Glass Windows at St. Nicholas, Longparish, Hampshire
 Longparish Cricket Club

Villages in Hampshire
Test Valley